Lioptilodes salarius is a species of moth in the genus Lioptilodes known from Argentina. Moths of this species take flight in January and have a wingspan of approximately 36 millimetres. The specific name "salarias" refers to Salar de Jama, whence the species was collected.

References

Platyptiliini
Moths described in 2006